The AFL Women's season seven All-Australian team represents the best-performed players of the AFL Women's season seven. The team was announced on 22 November 2022 as a complete women's Australian rules football team of 21 players. The team is honorary and does not play any games.

Selection panel
The selection panel for the AFL Women's season seven All-Australian team consisted of chairwoman Nicole Livingstone, Sarah Black, Sam Virgo, Andrew Dillon, Laura Kane, Kelli Underwood, Megan Waters, Narelle Smith and Tim Harrington.

Initial squad
The initial 42-woman All-Australian squad was announced on 8 November 2022. Minor premiers  had the most players selected in the initial squad with six.

Final team
The final team was announced on 22 November 2022.  and Brisbane had the most selections with four each, with nine teams represented overall. Ten players achieved selection for the first time, while six players from the 2022 team were selected, with  captain Emma Kearney achieving selection for the seventh consecutive year. North Melbourne midfielder Jasmine Garner was named as All-Australian captain, while Brisbane captain Breanna Koenen was named as vice-captain. Brisbane midfielder Ally Anderson, who won the AFL Women's season seven best and fairest award, became the first AFLW player to win the league best and fairest award but miss All-Australian selection in the same season.

Note: the position of coach in the AFL Women's All-Australian team is traditionally awarded to the coach of the premiership-winning team.

References

External links
 AFLW Awards

AFL Women's season seven